The following are the statistics of the Swedish football Division 2 for the 1993 season.

League standings

Division 2 Norrland

Division 2 Östra Svealand

Division 2 Västra Svealand

Division 2 Östra Götaland

Division 2 Västra Götaland

Division 2 Södra Götaland

References

Sweden - List of final tables (Clas Glenning)

3
1993
Sweden
Sweden